Phrack is an e-zine written by and for hackers, first published November 17, 1985. Described by Fyodor as "the best, and by far the longest running hacker zine," the magazine is open for contributions by anyone who desires to publish remarkable works or express original ideas on the topics of interest. It has a wide circulation which includes both hackers and computer security professionals.

Originally covering subjects related to phreaking, anarchy and cracking, the articles also cover a wide range of topics including computer and physical security, hacking, cryptography, counter culture and international news.

Phrack "has had its finger on the pulse of hacker culture", and is considered both a handbook and manifesto for hackers.

Publications

E-Zine Releases
Issues of Phrack are divided in volumes, covering 1 or more years of publication.

Hardcover Releases

There were 3 hardcover releases. Each hardcover release contained most (but not all) articles of the E-Zine release. Both the hardcover and E-Zine were released simultaneously.

The PDF of the Phrack #63 Hardcover was made public in 2019.

History
Phrack, first released on November 17, 1985, takes its name from the words "phreak" and "hack". The founding editors of the magazine, known by the pseudonyms "Taran King" and "Knight Lightning", edited most of the first 30 editions. Editions were originally released onto the Metal Shop bulletin board system, where Taran King was a sysop, and widely mirrored by other boards. The headquarters was in Austin, Texas.

During its first 10 years of publication, Phrack was largely associated with telecommunications fraud, providing material for phreakers and informing about arrests in this community through its Phrack World News feature articles. Along with the release of articles such as "Smashing The Stack For Fun And Profit" and the editorship of daemon9/route in 1996, Phrack's orientation shifted toward computer security and its focus drew closer to the current definition of hacking.

Arrest of Knight Lightning
 
The 24th issue of Phrack, released February 1989, included a document relating to the workings of Enhanced 911 emergency response systems. This document, copied from a BellSouth computer, played a major part in a series of Secret Service raids called Operation Sundevil and featured in Bruce Sterling's book The Hacker Crackdown. Phracks editor, Knight Lightning, was arrested and charged with access device fraud and transportation of stolen property.  The proceedings which ensued are known formally as United States v. Riggs, named for Knight Lightning's co-defendant Robert Riggs.

The E911 document was an administrative document describing which parts of the organization are responsible for what parts of the E911 system.

The Electronic Frontier Foundation filed an amicus brief supporting Knight Lightning, and helped to get the case dropped by introducing a witness who showed that Bellcore was selling more detailed documentation to the E911 system for as little as $13 to anyone who asked. The E911 document had been valued by the prosecution at over $80,000. The case was then dropped.

Phrack also showed up in the two-part "Operation Moon Witch" storyline, published in 1992's The Hacker Files by DC Comics, a story based on Operation Sundevil.

Pre 2000
After the arrest of Knight Lightning, and the shutdown of Phrack by the US Secret Service in late December 1989 few weeks after issue #30 was released, some attempts were made to resurrect Phrack under the editorship of Doc Holiday and Crimson Death. However, the lack of consent from the original editor to accept this Phrack Classic led to a new editorship for issue #33 by Dispater under the name Diet Phrack until issue #41.

Despite having acted as an informant against a member of a rival board after his arrest in March 1991, issue #42 is released under the editorship of Erik Bloodaxe in 1992. This new editorial staff makes Phrack legal and the magazine obtained an ISSN number from the Library of Congress. In September 1994, the first Phrack website appeared with release #46, containing all the files from the previous issues.
 
With the growing use of the internet and interest in computer security, 1996 marks a new era for Phrack as the magazine became increasingly oriented toward computer security.  The editorship was handed to route along with voyager until 2000 (release #56). During this period, the Phrack website was defaced several times and the magazine was often unavailable.

Continuation after 2000

In 2000, the future editor gained control of the domain phrack.org (then registered at gandi.net, and not related to phrack.com) and started hosting all phrack releases (#1-#56) on a new website. Phrack.org became the de facto location for the Phrack Magazine after 2000. The previous editor (route) transferred control of phrack.com to the new staff in 2001.

Since 2001 Phrack is edited under the alias Phrackstaff to hide the identity of the true chief editor for the magazine. During the period from 2002 to 2005, a rival group referring itself as the Phrack High Council, "proud supporters of Project Mayhem",[14] protested against the supposed white hat behavior of certain members of the Phrackstaff and of some previous editorial staff members[15] mainly on the Full-Disclosure mailing list. However none of their files were actually incorporated in the official Phrack magazine as it had been the case after the Phrack Classic/Diet Phrack controversy.

In 2005, a former editor took the initiative to announce "the end of Phrack" despite a new team of editors having been formed. That announcement generated, as intended, quite some noise around issue #63. However, the announcement was actually more about the end of some major German/Austrian hacking groups such as TESO from which some of the 2001 to 2005 staff originated. Some of the staff re-grouped in 2007 with other members from the hacking community to continue Phrack.

Continuation after 2006
[[Image:Phrack.png|right|thumb|Phrack logo used on Phrack'''s website.]]

In 2005, it was announced that Phrack was to come to an end, with the 63rd issue as its last. To commemorate Phracks final appearance, this issue was to be a hardback edition, released simultaneously at the DEF CON and What the Hack conventions on July 29. An e-zine version of the release followed on August 1.  The European printer for the hardcopies of Phrack to be distributed at Defcon refused to fulfil the order once they realized that they were printing a Hacking book. Two University of Arizona students filled the gap and printed between 100 and 200 copies of Phrack 63 in time for release at Defcon 13.

Copies of Phrack 63 distributed at Defcon 13 are each stamped with a "serial" number on the inside of the last page.  It is believed that there are 100 numbered copies of Phrack 63 distributed at Defcon.  All copies were hand cut and bound; unnumbered copies may be unreleased "extras", or may have cutting errors that deemed them unfit for distribution.

Issue 63 told readers to "expect a new release," and on May 27, 2007, issue 64 was released by a new board of editors referring to themselves as "The Circle of Lost Hackers". (TCLH). TCLH eventually released issue #65 of Phrack on April 11, 2008. On June 11, 2009, TCLH released another issue of Phrack, bringing the count up to 66. On March 15, 2010, it was announced that the 67th issue would be released on July 11, yet it was later postponed.

ContentPhrack issues are released irregularly, and like academic publications issues are grouped into volumes. Each issue comprises a number of Philes: stand-alone text files of very technical or counter-cultural content. Philes are submitted by members of the hacker underground community, and are reviewed by the editors.

Having an article published in Phrack is seen as prestigious by hackers, and often allowed access to more sources of information.

In addition to technical articles, Phrack also provided a focus for news and gossip among the hacker community.

In the 1990 National Computer Security Conference, Sheldon Zenner and Dorothy Denning suggested that Phrack articles contained the same factual content in computer and security magazines, but differed in tone.

Notable articlesPhrack is especially popular due to the general high standard of the releases compared to other underground zines, but has made its reputation from a number of high-quality articles.
 "\/\The Conscience of a Hacker/\/ (aka the Hacker Manifesto)" by The Mentor has been an inspiration to young hackers since the 1980s, having been published in the 7th issue of Phrack.
 "Smashing The Stack For Fun And Profit" by Aleph One, published in issue 49, is the "classic paper" on stack buffer overflows, partly responsible for popularizing the vulnerability.
 "The Art of Scanning" by Fyodor, published September 1, 1997 in Issue 51 introduced the nmap Internet scanning tool.

Regular features
Several regular columns are present in most issues of Phrack'', such as:
 Prophile - the presentation of a very influential character from the hacking underground.
 Loopback - answers to the most original (or stupid) emails received by the phrack staff.
 Phrack World News - a compilation of reports on the latest counter-culture events.
 International Scenes - a compilation of testimonies from hackers all around the world focusing on national and international activities.

References

External links
 
 the entire run of PHRACK on textfiles.com
Phrack 63 Hardcover PDF

1985 establishments in Texas
Hacker magazines
Irregularly published magazines published in the United States
Magazines established in 1985
Magazines published in Austin, Texas
Works about computer hacking